Ailsa Mary-Ellen Piper (born 1959) is an Australian writer, director and performer.

Career

Acting
Ailsa Piper worked as an actress in theatre in Perth, Sydney and Melbourne from the early 1980s until 2000. She made her first appearance on TV in 1984 in Man of Letters, but is best known for playing Ruth Wilkinson in the soap opera Neighbours from 1996 until 1999. She reprised the role in a cameo for the series' 20th anniversary in 2005.

Piper is an accomplished narrator of audio books, and continues to work in this field. In 2016, she narrated Hope Farm by Peggy Drew and The Natural Way of Things by Charlotte Wood.
She also performs a monologue based on the influence of poetry in her life and in particular, on her walking. This was first broadcast on ABC radio's Poetica programme, but has been adapted by Piper for live performance.

Writing and directing 
Ailsa Piper has written for ABC radio, for the theatre, and for The Age, The Australian, "Slow Living" magazine and Eureka Street, as well as various online journals.

In 2000 she was a co-winner of the Patrick White Playwrights' Award for her drama Small Mercies.

In 2012, her first book, Sinning Across Spain, was published by Melbourne University Press. In the same year, Bell Shakespeare produced a version of The Duchess of Malfi which was co-adapted by Piper.

Her next book, The Attachment, was published by Allen and Unwin in 2017. It is co-authored by Tony Doherty.

Piper has directed for Red Stitch, the Melbourne Theatre Company, the VCA, WAAPA and Shy Tiger Productions. Her production of The Night Season was nominated for a Greenroom Award for direction. She has served on numerous boards, and has five times judged the Victorian Premier's Literary Awards - four times for Drama and once for fiction. She chaired the judging panel for the 2016 NSW Premiers Award for Drama, and will do so again for the 2017 award.

Ailsa Piper is an accomplished moderator/interviewer and regularly hosts conversations at literary festivals or libraries.

Personal life 
Piper was married to Australian television actor Peter Curtin from 1987 until his death in 2014.

References

External links 
 
 

1959 births
Living people
Actresses from Western Australia
Australian soap opera actresses
Australian theatre directors
Australian women dramatists and playwrights
20th-century Australian actresses
20th-century Australian dramatists and playwrights
20th-century Australian women writers
21st-century Australian actresses
21st-century Australian dramatists and playwrights
21st-century Australian women writers